Anandamayi Kali Temple 
() is a Hindu temple on Anandamoyi Kali Mandir Road in Brahmanbaria town, Bangladesh. The goddess Kali reportedly appeared miraculously in this place in 1900.

History 
The first establishment of Sri Sri Anandamayi Kali Temple was in 1900. The goddess Kali is said to have appeared miraculously in this place in 1900. The foundation of the newly built temple was laid on 11 December 1997. The newly built temple was inaugurated and established on 16 January 1999. In this way Anandamayi Kali Temple was established.

The God of Kali Mata 
The god of Sri Sri Anandamayi Kali Mata is made of stone and the idol of Mahadev is made of stone.

Location 
This temple is located on Anandamayi Kali Temple Road, the heart of Brahmanbaria district in Bangladesh.

References 

Hindu temples in Bangladesh
Brahmanbaria